Dicyrtomina minuta is a species of globular springtails in the family Dicyrtomidae.

References

External links

 

Collembola
Articles created by Qbugbot
Animals described in 1783